Shriniwas Dadasaheb Patil (born 11 February 1941) is an Indian politician and ex-officer of the Indian Administrative Services (IAS). Since October 2019, he is the Member of Lok Sabha from the Satara constituency from Maharashtra, India. 

Patil completed his M.A. Economics and LL.B. degree from Pune and Mumbai University respectively. He was the officer of Indian Administrative Services of 1979 batch. Thereafter he served as the collector of Beed district and Pune district. He has been deputy CEO of Maharashtra Industrial Development Corporation (MIDC). 

He was elected as member of the 13th and 14th Lok Sabha of India, from 1999 to 2009 representing the Karad constituency from the Nationalist Congress Party (NCP). In 2013, he was appointed the Governor of Sikkim; the position that he continued till August 2018. He was elected as Member of Parliament for the third time by defeating former Member of Parliament Udayanraje Bhosale by over 87,000 votes in October 2019 bypolls.

References

|-

|-

External links
 http://shriniwaspatil.com/
 http://www.rajbhavansikkim.gov.in/

1941 births
Living people
Nationalist Congress Party politicians from Maharashtra
Governors of Sikkim
Lok Sabha members from Maharashtra
India MPs 1999–2004
India MPs 2004–2009
People from Karad
People from Satara (city)
Indian Administrative Service officers